Charles Michael Magill (February 8, 1920; Haddonfield, New Jersey – August 31, 2006; Haddonfield, New Jersey) was an American racecar driver.

After serving in the Army during World War II, Magill raced in the AAA and USAC Championship Car series from 1955 to 1959, with 15 career starts.  He finished in the top ten 7 times, with his best finish in 4th position in 1955 at Langhorne.

Magill competed in the Indianapolis 500 three times, with his first start coming in 1957.  The next year, when racing legend Juan Manuel Fangio was unable to compete due to a contractual conflict, Magill drove the car in which Fangio had been practicing.  He was involved in an accident in the first lap of the race but, after over an hour in the pits, he returned to the track to finish 17th.  He drove in his final 500 in 1959, when he was eliminated from the race in a four-car accident.

Indianapolis 500 results

World Championship career summary
The Indianapolis 500 was part of the FIA World Championship from 1950 through 1960. Drivers competing at Indy during those years were credited with World Championship points and participation. Mike Magill participated in 3 World Championship races but scored no World Championship points.

External links
Three-Time Indianapolis 500 Starter Magill Dies At 86

1920 births
2006 deaths
Indianapolis 500 drivers
People from Haddonfield, New Jersey
Racing drivers from New Jersey
Sportspeople from Camden County, New Jersey